Steve McLelland (born 25 August 1957) is a Scottish former professional footballer who played as a defender and forward for Largs Thistle, Ayr United, Motherwell, Hamilton Academical and Green Gully.

References

1957 births
Living people
Scottish footballers
Largs Thistle F.C. players
Ayr United F.C. players
Motherwell F.C. players
Hamilton Academical F.C. players
Green Gully SC players
Scottish Football League players
Association football defenders
Association football forwards
Scottish expatriate footballers
Scottish expatriates in Australia
Expatriate soccer players in Australia